The 1997–98 Russian Cup was the sixth season of the Russian football knockout tournament since the dissolution of Soviet Union.

First round
2 May 1997.

4 May 1997.

5 May 1997.

Second round
15 May 1997

16 May 1997.

Third round

Fourth round
Russian Premier League teams FC Fakel Voronezh and FC Shinnik Yaroslavl started at this stage.

6 July 1997.

21 July 1997.

Round of 32
All the other Russian Premier League teams started at this stage.

Round of 16

Quarter-finals

Semi-finals

Final

Played in the earlier stages, but not in the final game:

FC Spartak Moscow: Vadim Evseev (DF), Ramiz Mamedov (DF), Konstantin Golovskoy (DF), Aleksei Melyoshin (MF), Aleksei Bakharev (MF), Aleksandr Shirko (FW), Sergey Dmitriev (FW), Aleksei Zlydnev (FW), Sergei Lutovinov (FW), Luis Robson  (FW).

FC Lokomotiv Moscow: Aleksandr Podshivalov (GK), Aleksei Arifullin (DF), Andrei Lavrik  (DF), Oleg Pashinin  (DF), Vladimir Maminov  (MF), Aleksandr Smirnov (MF), Bakhva Tedeyev (MF), Albert Sarkisyan  (MF), Vitali Veselov (FW), Oleh Haras  (FW).

References

Russian Cup seasons
Russian Cup
Cup
Cup